Zyngoonops is a genus of Central African goblin spiders that was first described by P. L. G. Benoit in 1977.

Species
 it contains ten species, found only in the Central African Republic and the Middle Africa:
Zyngoonops beatriceae Fannes, 2013 – Congo
Zyngoonops chambersi Fannes, 2013 – Congo
Zyngoonops clandestinus Benoit, 1977 (type) – Congo
Zyngoonops goedaerti Fannes, 2013 – Congo
Zyngoonops marki Fannes, 2013 – Congo
Zyngoonops moffetti Fannes, 2013 – Congo
Zyngoonops redii Fannes, 2013 – Congo
Zyngoonops rockoxi Fannes, 2013 – Congo
Zyngoonops swammerdami Fannes, 2013 – Congo
Zyngoonops walcotti Fannes, 2013 – Central African Rep.

See also
 List of Oonopidae species

References

Araneomorphae genera
Oonopidae
Spiders of Africa